"Nichimgriff" (Notundercontrol) is a song by Farin Urlaub Racing Team. It's the first single from Farin Urlaub's third solo studio album Die Wahrheit übers Lügen.

For the whole Racing Team, this is the second single and as that, the first taste of what FURT sounds in studio, because the only previous single "Zehn" is from the live album Livealbum of Death.

The song is about a man, who thinks he's perfect in every way and others are to blame for his faults; nobody pays him respect. Thus, he doesn't have his life under control.

The single was released on October 17.

Music video
The video debuted on MTV Central in the show "TRL" on September 26.

It shows FURT performing in a gas station. A symbol from the album art of Endlich Urlaub!, an orange jerrycan is seen throughout the song. A parallel storyline shows a young woman getting into an Opel Commodore A with a friend and then driving off, headbanging to the music. On the road, they pick up many different people and then all headbang together, till they drive into the gas station, which makes it blow up.

Track listing

 "Nichimgriff" – 2:46
 "Bewegungslos" (Motionless) – 3:14
 "Nichimgriff" (Video) – 2:58

2008 singles
Songs written by Farin Urlaub
Farin Urlaub Racing Team songs
2008 songs